The 1952 United States Senate election in Texas was held on November 4, 1952. Incumbent Democratic U.S. Senator Tom Connally did not run for re-election to a fifth term.

Attorney General Price Daniel won the open race to succeed him, defeating U.S. Representative Lindley Beckworth in the Democratic primary on July 26. Daniel was unopposed in the general election, as the Texas Republican Party chose to endorse the Democratic ticket for all but one statewide offices to maximize votes for their presidential nominee Dwight Eisenhower.

Democratic primary

Candidates
Lindley Beckworth, U.S. Representative from Tyler
Price Daniel, Attorney General of Texas
E.W. Napier

Results

General election

Results

See also 
 1952 United States Senate elections

References

Texas
1952
Senate
Single-candidate elections